Le Grand Secret (The Great Secret/The Immortals) is a 1989 miniseries co-produced by France, Germany, Spain and Canada and directed by Jacques Trébouta. The screenplay by André Cayatte was based on the eponymous science fiction novel by René Barjavel, (Le grand secret). The production, starring Claude Rich, Louise Marleau, Peter Sattmann, Claude Jade and Fernando Rey, tells the story of a grand conspiracy between world leaders.

Plot
Jeanne Corbet (Louise Marleau) is having an affair with Roland Fournier (Peter Sattmann), a researcher working on a cancer treatment in the Paris suburb of Villejuif. Married to Professor Paul Corbet (Fernando Rey), an older scientist who tolerates the affair, Jeanne is obsessed with her lover. During mysterious events controlled by the secret service, Roland disappears while Jeanne simultaneously experiences a kidnapping attempt. Samuel Frend (Claude Rich), an American secret agent based in France, comes in contact with Jeanne and informs her that her lover is not dead. Once convinced that Roland is alive, Jeanne devotes her life to searching the world for him.

In Caracas, she finds Frend and his wife Suzan (Claude Jade), but she loses track of the couple a few days later. The source of the cover-up of Roland's disappearance is revealed: Professor Bahanba (Richard Münch), an Indian scientist also working on a cancer treatment, has discovered JL3, an immortality serum that stops aging and eliminates vulnerability to disease in any living being.

A few years later, it is announced that Samuel Frend has died, but Jeanne does not believe that he was killed in an accident, as was reported. She visits Suzan, who now lives in Bennington (Vermont), and learns that the "widow" is a secret service officer. Jeanne learns that Samuel, now known as Colonel Bass, is on an island called 307, which is guarded day and night by the army. The island hosts a self-sufficient community led by Professor Bahanba, who also acts as the community's spiritual guide. Jeanne, now fifty years old, travels to the island and finds Roland, who is still a spirited young man of thirty. Their love is not what it once was and Jeanne finds herself unable to contract symptoms.

Throughout her search, Jeanne learns about numerous world leaders involved in the cover-up, including Indira Gandhi, Queen Elizabeth II and Ronald Reagan.

Differences from the book
In Barjavel's novel, Jeanne's search takes 17 years and begins in 1955. Other world leaders are also involved in the conspiracy, including Jawaharlal Nehru and John F. Kennedy.

Cast 
Louise Marleau as Jeanne Corbet
Claude Rich as Samuel Frend
Peter Sattmann as Roland Fournier
Fernando Rey as Paul Corbet
Claude Jade as Suzan Frend
Paul Guers as William Garrett
Richard Münch as Shri Bahanba
Alain Mottet as Hamblain
Leila Fréchet as Annie
Juan José Artero as Den
Martine Sarcey as Madame Fournier
Fernando Guillén Cuervo as Han
Blanca Marsillach as Mary
Annick Blancheteau as Lady Olgivie
Sophie Renoir as Mrs. Barnajee
Huguette Funfrock as Queen Elizabeth II
 Tatiana Mouroumzeff as Indira Gandhi

External links 
 
 

1989 French television series debuts
French-language television shows
French science fiction television series
1989 Canadian television series debuts
1989 French television series endings
1989 Canadian television series endings
1980s Canadian television miniseries
1980s French television miniseries
1980s Canadian science fiction television series